Gingipain K (Lys-gingipain, PrtP proteinase) is an enzyme. This enzyme catalyses the following chemical reaction

 Endopeptidase with strict specificity for lysyl bonds

Activity of this enzyme is stimulated by glycine.

See also
 Gingipain
 Gingipain R

References

External links 
 

EC 3.4.22